Brown v British Abrasive Wheel Co [1919] 1 Ch 290 is a UK company law case, concerning the validity of an alteration to a company's constitution, which adversely affect the interests of one of the shareholders.

Facts
British Abrasive Wheel Co needed to raise further capital. The 98% majority were willing to provide this capital if they could buy up the 2% minority. Having failed to effect this buying agreement, the 98% purposed to change the articles of association to give them the power to purchase the shares of the minority. The proposed article provided for the compulsory purchase of the minority's shares on certain terms. However, the majority were prepared to insert a provision regarding price which stated that the minority would get a price which the court thought was fair.

Judgment
Astbury J held that the alteration was not for the benefit of the company as a whole and could not be made. One reason for this was that there was no direct link between the provision of the extra capital and the alteration of the articles. Although the whole scheme had been to provide the capital after removing the dissenting shareholders, it would in fact have been possible to remove the shareholders and then refuse to provide the capital.

See also

UK company law
Allen v Gold Reefs of West Africa Ltd [1900] 1 Ch 656
Sidebottom v Kershaw, Leese & Co Ltd [1920] 1 Ch 154
Dafen Tinplate Co Ltd v Llanelly Steel Co (1907) Ltd [1920] 2 Ch 124
Shuttleworth v Cox Bros and Co (Maidenhead) [1927] 1 Ch 154
Southern Foundries (1926) Ltd v Shirlaw [1940] AC 701
Greenhalgh v Arderne Cinemas Ltd [1951] Ch 286

Notes

1919 in case law
United Kingdom company case law
1919 in British law